The Burma Mines Railway is a  gauge railway in Myanmar for the transportation of locally mined silver and lead ore to a smelter at Namtu.

History
The Burma Mines, Railway and Smelting Co Ltd was founded in March 1906 and the construction of the railway started in 1907, to reach the Tiger Camp mining area in 1908, with a  extension to the Bawdwin mines and included a Z-reverse at Wallah Gorge, just before Tiger Camp, which was later replaced by a spiral.

The railway's headquarters and workshops were built in Namtu.

In 1914 the connection with the metre gauge Burma Railways was moved from Manpwe to Namyao, a short distance to the east. After the First World War, the local Burma Corporation Ltd took over operations and built an electrified underground railway at Tiger Camp and 100 hopper cars were ordered from the American Pressed Steel Car Company.

In the 1930s the line experienced its peak traffic. Steam was largely replaced in the 1970s and 1980s but today two steam locos remain in working order.

Present day
In present day, the coal for the smelters and the finished products is transported by road. Ore transport from Bawdwin to Namtu is still done by rail. The section from Namyao to Namtu sees little traffic. Namtu is a security area and restrictions are placed on visiting the railway, mines and smelters, except on official tours.

See also
 Rail transport in Burma

References

External links
 Namtu Mines Railways - A set on Flickr
 Burma Mines Railways - A set on Fotocommunity
 
2 ft gauge railways in Myanmar
Railway companies established in 1906
Mining in Myanmar
Mining railways
Railways with Zig Zags
1906 establishments in Burma